Jonathan Docking is an Australian former professional rugby league footballer who played in the 1980s and 1990s.

Playing career
A Cronulla junior, Docking  played for the Sharks for eight seasons between 1984 and 1991, debuting as a 20-year-old. He played over 160 first grade games and scored 57 first grade tries during his career.

However, Docking was soon shifted by Cronulla to the  position where he would develop into one of the club's mainstays from the day he led Cronulla to a victory over three-time premiers Parramatta in his fourth appearance in first grade. Docking was alongside Gary Belcher and Garry Jack the best broken-field runner in the Winfield Cup for most of his career, with a highlight being his brilliant display against the Brisbane Broncos in a play-off for fifth in 1989.

Docking was chosen to represent New South Wales in one match during each of the State of Origin series of 1987 and 1988. However, at the close of the 1991 season, Docking was told by the Sharks that his services were no longer required due to the club's financial problems, and although he was only 28, no other Winfield Cup club sought Docking's services for 1992.

References

Australian rugby league players
Cronulla-Sutherland Sharks players
New South Wales Rugby League State of Origin players
New South Wales City Origin rugby league team players
Living people
People from the Sutherland Shire
Rugby league players from Sydney
Rugby league fullbacks
1964 births
People educated at De La Salle College, Cronulla